Gabriela Sabatini was the defending champion and successfully defended her title, defeating Steffi Graf in the final, 6–4, 7–6(8–6).

Seeds 
The top eight seeds received a bye to the second round.
  Steffi Graf (final)
  Gabriela Sabatini (champion)
  Mary Joe Fernández (quarterfinal)
  Jennifer Capriati (semifinal)
  Conchita Martínez (second round)
  Barbara Paulus (second round)
  Natalia Zvereva (third round)
  Nathalie Tauziat (semifinal)
  Helen Kelesi (third round)
  Sandra Cecchini (first round)
  Anne Smith (first round)
  Laura Gildemeister (third round)
  Rosalyn Fairbank-Nideffer (first round)
  Anke Huber (third round)
 n/a
  Meredith McGrath (quarterfinal)

Draw

Finals

Top half

Section 1

Section 2

Bottom half

Section 1

Section 2

References

External links 
 ITF tournament edition details

1991 WTA Tour
Virginia Slims of Florida
Virginia Slims of Florida
Virginia Slims of Florida
Virginia Slims of Florida